Émilie Volle (born 8 October 1981) is a French gymnast. She competed at the 1996 Summer Olympics.

References

External links
 

1981 births
Living people
French female artistic gymnasts
Olympic gymnasts of France
Gymnasts at the 1996 Summer Olympics
Sportspeople from Saint-Étienne
20th-century French women